João Pedro Araújo Correia (born 5 September 1996) is a professional footballer who plays for G.D. Chaves as a forward. Born in Portugal, he plays for the Cape Verde national team.

Football career
On 8 August 2015, Correia made his professional debut with Vitória Guimarães B in a 2015–16 Segunda Liga match against Santa Clara.

International career
Born in Portugal, Correa is of Cape Verdean descent. He was called up to represent the Cape Verde national team for a set of friendlies in March 2022. He debuted with Cape Verde in a 2–0 friendly win over Guadeloupe.

References

External links

1996 births
Sportspeople from Setúbal
Living people
Cape Verdean footballers
Cape Verde international footballers
Portuguese footballers
Portuguese sportspeople of Cape Verdean descent
Association football forwards
Liga Portugal 2 players
Campeonato de Portugal (league) players
C.D. Pinhalnovense players
Vitória S.C. B players
G.D. Chaves players